Kim Yong-gyu (born 12 November 1971) is a South Korean former cyclist. He competed at the 1988 Summer Olympics and the 1992 Summer Olympics.

References

1971 births
Living people
South Korean male cyclists
Olympic cyclists of South Korea
Cyclists at the 1988 Summer Olympics
Cyclists at the 1992 Summer Olympics
Place of birth missing (living people)
Asian Games medalists in cycling
Asian Games bronze medalists for South Korea
Cyclists at the 1990 Asian Games
Medalists at the 1990 Asian Games